Silene rubella is a species of flowering plant in the family Caryophyllaceae. In Italy the species goes by the common name silene rosseggiante.

The plant live along dry-farmed fields. The flowers have red petals and the calyx is also reddish.

The species is native to Cyprus, Egypt, Iran, Iraq, Italy, Lebanon, Syria, Morocco, Portugal, Spain, Tunisia, and in countries that used to made up Yugoslavia. It is also native to Western Sahara. In Egypt among winter weeds this species is rare.

References

rubella